Carly is a given name, a feminine form of Carl. It is also a pet form of given names such as Carla and Caroline. Variant different spellings include Carley, Carlie, Carlee, Carleigh and Carli, as well as Karly, Karli, Karley, Karlee, Karlie and Karleigh. 

The name became popular in large part, if not primarily, because of the success of Carly Simon's music in the 1970s - its first appearance in the top 1000 US baby names was in 1973, soon after her first success. It was most popular in the UK, Canada and Australia in the 1980s and in the United States during the 1990s. Over 2,000 American baby girls were named Carly each year between 1991 and 1998.

Carly and its variants may refer to:

People

 Carly Binding (born 1978), New Zealand pop singer-songwriter
 Carly Booth (born 1992), Scottish professional golfer
 Carly Chaikin (born 1990), American actress
 Carly Cole (born 1984), British reality television contestant, fitness trainer and model
 Carly Colón (born 1979), male Puerto Rican-Canadian professional wrestler
 Carly Craig (born 1980), American actress
 Carly Dixon (born 1973), Australian Olympic judoka
 Carly Fiorina (born 1954), American business executive and politician
 Carly Flynn, New Zealand journalist and television presenter
 Carly Foulkes (born 1988), Canadian model and actress
 Carly Gullickson (born 1986), American professional tennis player
 Carly Hibberd (1985–2011), Australian road cyclist
 Carly Hillman (born 1983), British actress
 Carly Hunt (born 1981), English footballer
 Carly Janiga (born 1988), American gymnast
 Carly Rae Jepsen (born 1985), Canadian recording artist and singer-songwriter
 Carly McKillip (born 1989), Canadian actress and musician
 Carly Melin (born 1985), American politician
 Carly Milne, Canadian writer
 Carly Paradis (born 1980), Canadian composer and pianist
 Carly Patterson (born 1988), American gymnast and singer
 Carly Pearce (born 1990), American country music singer and songwriter
 Carly Piper (born 1983), American Olympic swimmer
 Carly Pope (born 1980), Canadian actress
 Carly Schroeder (born 1990), German-American film and television actress
 Carly Simon (born 1943), American singer-songwriter, musician, and children's author
 Carly Smithson (born 1983), Irish American soul / pop rock singer-songwriter and actress
 Carly Rose Sonenclar (born 1999), American singer, songwriter, and child actress
 Carly Telford (born 1987), English international football goalkeeper
 Carly Wilson (born 1982), Australian basketball player

Pseudonyms
 "Carly Phillips", pen name of American novelist Karen Drogin (born 1965)

Fictional characters
 Carly Cardinal, mascot for the National Arbor Day Foundation
 Carly Corinthos, on the American soap opera General Hospital
 Carly Manning, on the American soap opera Days of Our Lives
 Carly Morris, on the Australian soap opera Home and Away
 Carly Shay, on the Nickelodeon series iCarly and its revival series of the same name.
 Carly Snyder, on the American soap opera As the World Turns
 Carly Wicks, on the BBC soap opera EastEnders
 Carly Witwicky, in the Transformers franchise
 Carly Norris, on the film Sliver

References

See also 

Carle (disambiguation)
Carley (disambiguation)
Carlye J. Hughes
Carli (given name)
Carry (name)
Charly (name)
Kali (disambiguation)
Karly

English feminine given names
English-language feminine given names